Tabulata, commonly known as tabulate corals, are an order of extinct forms of coral.  They are almost always colonial, forming colonies of individual hexagonal cells known as corallites defined by a skeleton of calcite, similar in appearance to a honeycomb.  Adjacent cells are joined by small pores.  Their distinguishing feature is their well-developed horizontal internal partitions (tabulae) within each cell, but reduced or absent vertical internal partitions (septa).  They are usually smaller than rugose corals, but vary considerably in shape, from flat to conical to spherical.

Around 300 species have been described.  Among the most common tabulate corals in the fossil record are Aulopora, Favosites, Halysites, Heliolites, Pleurodictyum, Sarcinula and Syringopora. Tabulate corals with massive skeletons often contain endobiotic symbionts, such as cornulitids and Chaetosalpinx.

Like rugose corals, they lived entirely during the Paleozoic, being found from the Ordovician to the Permian.  With Stromatoporoidea and rugose corals, the tabulate corals are characteristic of the shallow waters of the Silurian and Devonian.  Sea levels rose in the Devonian, and tabulate corals became much less common.   They finally became extinct in the Permian–Triassic extinction event.

Gallery

References

 Invertebrate Fossils; Moore, Lalicker, & Fischer; McGraw-Hill 1952.
 Treatise on Invertebrate Paleontology Part F, Coelenterata. Geological Society of America and Univ Kansas Press. R.C. Moore (ed).

 
Hexacorallia
Prehistoric animal orders
Cnidarian orders